Stenentoma is a genus of moths belonging to the subfamily Olethreutinae of the family Tortricidae.

Species
Stenentoma chrysolampra Diakonoff, 1969
Stenentoma onychosema Diakonoff, 1969

See also
List of Tortricidae genera

References

External links
tortricidae.com

Tortricidae genera